Victor Stone, also known as Cyborg, is a fictional character in the DC Extended Universe. Based on the character of the same name appearing in publications from DC Comics, he is portrayed by Ray Fisher. Originally appearing as a cameo in Batman v Superman: Dawn of Justice, Stone had a prominent role in the film Justice League. Cyborg's role in the latter film was subject to controversy as his backstory was heavily trimmed down in the theatrical release, in addition to sparking a conflict between Fisher, Joss Whedon, who had replaced Zack Snyder as director during post-production, and subsequently DC Films. Nonetheless, the character also appeared in Snyder's director's cut of Justice League (2021) with his original arc restored.

Development and portrayal

Comics origins and appearances in other media
A later addition to DC Comics' lineup of superhero characters, Cyborg first appeared in 1980 as a founding member of the Teen Titans. He later sees numerous arcs in the comics and is rebooted several times, becoming a founding member of the Justice League in the 2011 continuity relaunch. Cyborg famously appears in numerous adaptations of the Teen Titans, including the 2003–07 animated series and Teen Titans Go!, and numerous DC Comics animated films and video games. He is voiced by Khary Payton in many of these adaptations.

Casting and execution

Theater actor Ray Fisher was cast to play Victor Stone / Cyborg in the DCEU, beginning with the character's appearance in Batman v Superman. This was Fisher's first film role, as he had been a classically trained actor. Fisher had gained 20 pounds of muscle to portray Muhammad Ali in the play Fetch Clay, Make Man, after which talent agents sought him for the role of Cyborg. In the films, the effects for Cyborg's cybernetic parts are achieved using CGI and motion capture. 

A stand-alone Cyborg film was initially scheduled for a release date of April 3, 2020, but it has since been delayed. Cyborg, played by Ray Fisher, appears in Zack Snyder's Justice League (2021). Fisher was among several actors who returned to shoot additional footage for the "Snyder Cut".

When interviewed by Vanity Fair after the release of Zack Snyder's Justice League, screenwriter Chris Terrio, who also wrote Batman v Superman: Dawn of Justice, stated that he had worked extensively with Fisher on the development of the Victor Stone character. Terrio said that both men understood the "responsibility" of developing the first black superhero to appear in any DC film; while other black superheroes, such as Sam Wilson in the Marvel Cinematic Universe, had been seen in film before Justice League, Victor Stone/Cyborg was to be the first one cast in a starring role for a big-budget film, as this was before the release of Black Panther. Terrio also revealed that he was so upset with the removal of much of his work on the theatrical cut, including Cyborg's backstory, that he strongly considered having his name taken off the film before realizing it would cause more problems for the film's already troubled production.

James Gunn, the showrunner of the HBO Max series Peacemaker who would go-on to become the co-head of DC Studios, had originally planned for Cyborg and Batman, as depicted in the DCEU, to appear alongside the other four Justice League members in the show's season 1 finale, albeit portrayed by stand-ins, though Gunn stated that Warner Bros. had him remove Batman and Cyborg from the episode due to "upcoming DCEU projects".

Fisher/Whedon/Hamada conflict

Several years after the release of the theatrical version of Justice League, Fisher opened up about perceived mistreatment by Joss Whedon, who replaced Zack Snyder as director, while filming the reshoots, leading to a dispute with DC Films studio head Walter Hamada and DC Entertainment head Geoff Johns. Fisher specifically accused Whedon of "gross, abusive, unprofessional, and completely unacceptable" behavior, starting a series of Twitter posts about his experiences with the tagline "Accountability > Entertainment" that carried on in the following months. Other DCEU actors such as Aquaman actor Jason Momoa, Wonder Woman actress Gal Gadot, and Iris West actress Kiersey Clemons either offered their support for Fisher or alluded to their own negative experiences with Whedon. While Warner Media agreed to look into the matter and carried out its own investigation, allegedly leading to Whedon leaving production of the HBO series The Nevers, Fisher stated that he was no longer willing to work at DC Films under Hamada, calling him "the most dangerous kind of enabler" for allegedly tampering with the investigation. 

Cyborg was originally reported to appear in The Flash, but was reportedly written out of the film after Fisher declared he was unwilling to work with Hamada on any future DC Films productions in the aftermath of their conflict. The role is not expected to be recast in that film. In addition, Warner Bros. president Ann Sarnoff defended Hamada and the studio's handling of the investigation. Fisher later wrote: "If the end of my time as Cyborg is the cost for helping to bring awareness and accountability to Walter Hamada's actions—I'll pay it gladly." 

Fisher opened up about his experiences working at DC Films in greater detail following the release of Zack Snyder's Justice League. He later stated that he would return to the role of Cyborg for The Flash if Warner Bros. and Hamada released a formal apology to him.  Fisher's feud with the later-renamed DC Studios carried on after James Gunn had taken over as the studio co-head, as Fisher accused Gunn of supporting Whedon, a point which Gunn refuted.

Characterization and themes 

According to Fisher, Cyborg's backstory, as intended by Zack Snyder in his version of Justice League, was meant to "hit some hearts". Fisher mentions that Cyborg will have lost numerous elements of his personal life, including his original body, mother, ability to play football, and subsequently, his sense of self. Originally a cheerful, athletic, and intelligently gifted young man willing to help others, Victor becomes gloomy and depressed after his accident, no longer feeling fully human after being rebuilt. Despite his disillusionment with the world, Victor retains his selflessness after his accident, assisting a penniless single mother by manipulating her bank account as one of his first actions as Cyborg. After fighting alongside the Justice League for some time, however, Cyborg seems to have warmed a bit to all of his teammates. Having been rebuilt with alien technology by his estranged father, Silas, Victor Stone's arc in the "Snyder Cut" will see the character re-finding himself and his sense of humanity. Fisher also mentioned "There's a ton of allegory with respect to that in being a Black man, and just the journey that Black people have taken in this country." During early promotion of the theatrical cut, Fisher also mentioned that Cyborg's character was meant to represent people with disabilities in the film.

Fictional character biography

Origins 

In 2015, Stone is the starting quarterback for the Gotham City University football team, leading the team to a win over Wisconsin with his mother, Elinore, watching, but his father Silas is unable to attend due to his job as the director of S. T. A. R. Labs. Stone and Elinore have a talk about why Silas was unable to make it on their drive home, and as they are distracted, get into an accident that kills Elinore and maims Stone from the chest down. Silas secretly uses one of the Mother Boxes, being studied by S.T.A.R. Labs after it was discovered by the Nazis, to save Stone and build him into a cybernetic being. Though Stone survives, Silas declares him dead and gives him a burial marker next to his mother, hiding Stone in his apartment along with the Mother Box. 

The footage of his reconstruction is taken and decrypted from Lex Luthor's servers by Bruce Wayne to Diana Prince along with other information on fellow metahumans. Victor resents his father for being mostly absent in his life and for rebuilding him into a "monster" and blames him for his mother's death. 

Silas leaves him a tape that serves as guide on how to discover his newly-gained powers, which include the ability to remotely bypass encryption and manipulate computer systems at will, but Stone destroys the tape when Silas' recording becomes more personal. Silas informs Stone that Steppenwolf's parademons are after the Mother Box, leading to Stone burying it in his supposed grave.

Stopping Steppenwolf

Theatrical cut 

In 2017, Stone is adjusting to his new abilities and secretly listens in on a conversation between Wayne and Prince. He is later discovered at his father's home by Prince, who is attempting to recruit him and several other metahumans to team up against an extraterrestrial invasion by the tyrannical New God warlord Steppenwolf. Stone tells her he has been doing some "tracking" but declines to join her, Bruce and Barry Allen until he later finds his home ransacked and father kidnapped. Revealing that he had hidden the Mother Box Steppenwolf is after, Stone helps the fledgling metahuman team rescue Silas and other scientists from the demon and his parademon army in a S.T.A.R. Labs facility underneath Gotham Harbor, also retrieving the Motherbox.

As the team, which later sees Arthur Curry join, decides to use the Mother Box, which was used to successfully revive Stone as Cyborg, to resurrect Superman, Stone and Allen are sent to exhume Clark Kent's body, bonding with each other while doing so. The team successfully resurrects the Man of Steel with the relic and leftover technology from a Kryptonian scout ship in Metropolis, but Superman, having lost his memories, is triggered to attack the team when Cyborg's cannon accidentally shoots at Superman. The team is ultimately saved from being decimated when Wayne has his butler Alfred Pennyworth bring Kent's girlfriend Lois Lane, which calms Superman down. As Kent leaves with Lois to regain his memories, Steppenwolf steals the Mother Box while the team is distracted, and they resolve to face Steppenwolf in Russia without Superman in a final attempt to thwart his plan to destroy the Earth.

While Batman plans to distract Steppenwolf, Cyborg is assigned to pull apart the three Mother Boxes with Wonder Woman, Flash, and Aquaman flanking him. The plan is unsuccessful, with Cyborg being ripped in half by the New God at one point, until Superman arrives with his memories restored and aids the team in defeating the New God and his minions, who retreat back to Apokolips after Steppenwolf's axe is destroyed. Cyborg remains a part of the team, now named the Justice League, after the battle.

Director's cut

Prince meets with him to try and recruit him to Wayne's metahuman team. While angrily refusing at first, Stone joins Wayne's team after discovering his father's plight. He aids Allen in rescuing and evacuating his father and other hostages as he, Allen, Wayne and Prince are able to drive Steppenwolf away, though Steppenwolf deflects a missile shot by Victor and causes the facility to flood, requiring Curry to save them. Recovering the Mother Box, Stone informs the team on its history and explains how his father was able to temporarily activate the Mother Box without alerting Steppenwolf in the past to revive him, leading the team to realize they can use it to resurrect Superman. However, the team realizes the Mother Box will alert Steppenwolf this time around, but they unanimously decide to use it to revive Superman anyway as he is the only one of them powerful enough to go up against the New God one-on-one.

Stone utilizes his hacking powers to sneak the team and Superman's body into the Kryptonian scout ship within S.T.A.R. Labs' facility. Upon Allen and Stone activating the Mother Box to resurrect Kent, Victor has a premonition of the "Knightmare" timeline which sees Wonder Woman and Aquaman die and Superman fall under Darkseid's control after Lois Lane's death. Stone's cannon subsequently detects the revived but amnesiac Superman as a threat, automatically shooting at him. Following the team's resulting scuffle with Superman, which ends when Lois arrives and calms Kent down, Steppenwolf senses the Mother Box's activation and retrieves it, but not before Silas sacrifices himself to superheat the box, allowing Stone and Wayne to track it to an abandoned city in Russia. Stone assists Bruce with repairing a military aircraft to fly the team to Russia, finally enabling it to fly after finding and fixing a software bug in its firmware. As the team prepares its battle plan, Victor resolves to separate the three Mother Boxes to prevent their "Unity" from destroying Earth, enlisting Allen's charging ability to aid him while Batman destroys Steppenwolf's fortification around the Mother Boxes. 

The team fights their way into the nuclear facility, but cannot distract Steppenwolf long enough for Stone to get to the boxes until Superman arrives. Despite Superman's aid, Stone fails to separate the boxes in time and the Unity causes a large explosion, though Allen is able to reverse time by running faster than the speed of light and provide Stone with the needed spark. After a brief moment of temptation, Stone separates and destroys the boxes with Superman's help. Following Steppenwolf's defeat and death, Stone remains part of the team and finally listens to his father's encouragement after repairing the tape, becoming inspired to use his powers for good and accepting his new state while declaring he is "not broken" and not "alone". 

Cyborg is present in Wayne's "Knightmare" vision in which he, Batman, Flash, Mera, Deathstroke, and Joker are all being hunted by a Darkseid-controlled Superman.

Reception
Although Ray Fisher's performance in the theatrical Justice League film received a mixed response, his performance in Zack Snyder's Justice League received overwhelmingly positive reviews. Bradon Katz from The Observer wrote "Though Flash (Ezra Miller) and Aquaman (Jason Momoa) are also further fleshed out, it is Victor Stone who emerges as the soul of this blockbuster." Josh Wilding from ComicBookMovie wrote "The way things ultimately play out between them (and we’re not going to spoil anything here) also works perfectly, and Cyborg is one of the most complex, layered characters we’ve seen in a superhero movie for some time."

Following news of Fisher being supposedly written out of The Flash, fans flocked to Twitter to voice their support and sympathy for him after he released his statement responding to the news on the social media platform.

See also
Characters of the DC Extended Universe

References

 The plot description and characterization were adapted from Cyborg, Justice League (film), and Zack Snyder's Justice League at the DC Extended Universe Wiki, which are available under a Creative Commons Attribution-Share Alike 3.0 license.

External links

African-American superheroes
DC Comics American superheroes
Black characters in films
Characters created by Zack Snyder
DC Comics characters with superhuman strength
DC Comics scientists
DC Comics superheroes
DC Extended Universe characters
Fictional amputees
Fictional characters from New Jersey
DC Comics cyborgs
Fictional hackers
Fictional inventors
Fictional players of American football
Fictional technopaths
Film characters introduced in 2016
Male characters in film